In Colorado, State Highway 6 may refer to:
U.S. Route 6 in Colorado, the only Colorado highway numbered 6 since 1968
Colorado State Highway 6 (1923-1968), now US 50